In mathematics, a tube domain is a generalization of the notion of a vertical strip (or half-plane) in the complex plane to several complex variables.  A strip can be thought of as the collection of complex numbers whose real part lie in a given subset of the real line and whose imaginary part is unconstrained; likewise, a tube is the set of complex vectors whose real part is in some given collection of real vectors, and whose imaginary part is unconstrained.

Tube domains are domains of the Laplace transform of a function of several real variables (see multidimensional Laplace transform).  Hardy spaces on tubes can be defined in a manner in which a version of the Paley–Wiener theorem from one variable continues to hold, and characterizes the elements of Hardy spaces as the Laplace transforms of functions with appropriate integrability properties.  Tubes over convex sets are domains of holomorphy.  The Hardy spaces on tubes over convex cones have an especially rich structure, so that precise results are known concerning the boundary values of Hp functions.  In mathematical physics, the future tube is the tube domain associated to the interior of the past null cone in Minkowski space, and has applications in relativity theory and quantum gravity. Certain tubes over cones support a Bergman metric in terms of which they become bounded symmetric domains.  One of these is the Siegel half-space which is fundamental in arithmetic.

Definition
Let Rn denote real coordinate space of dimension n and Cn denote complex coordinate space.  Then any element of Cn can be decomposed into real and imaginary parts:

Let A be an open subset of Rn.  The tube over A, denoted TA, is the subset of Cn consisting of all elements whose real parts lie in A:

Tubes as domains of holomorphy

Suppose that A is a connected open set.  Then any complex-valued function that is holomorphic in a tube TA can be extended uniquely to a holomorphic function on the convex hull of the tube , which is also a tube, and in fact

Since any convex open set is a domain of holomorphy (holomorphically convex), a convex tube is also a domain of holomorphy.  So the holomorphic envelope of any tube is equal to its convex hull.

Hardy spaces
Let A be an open set in Rn.  The Hardy space H p(TA) is the set of all holomorphic functions F in TA such that

for all x in A.

In the special case of p = 2, functions in H2(TA) can be characterized as follows. Let ƒ be a complex-valued function on Rn satisfying

The Fourier–Laplace transform of ƒ is defined by

Then F is well-defined and belongs to H2(TA).  Conversely, every element of H2(TA) has this form.

A corollary of this characterization is that H2(TA) contains a nonzero function if and only if A contains no straight line.

Tubes over cones
Let A be an open convex cone in Rn.  This means that A is an open convex set such that, whenever x lies in A, so does the entire ray from the origin to x.  Symbolically,

If A is a cone, then the elements of H2(TA) have L2 boundary limits in the sense that

exists in L2(B).  There is an analogous result for Hp(TA), but it requires additional regularity of the cone (specifically, the dual cone A* needs to have nonempty interior).

See also
 Reinhardt domain
 Siegel domain

Notes

Citations

Sources

.
.
.
.
.

Fourier analysis
Harmonic analysis
Several complex variables